Lee Jae-woo (born June 28, 1991), also known as Lee Je-woo, is a South Korean actor. He is best known for his roles in the television series The K2 (2016), When the Camellia Blooms (2019), and Hi Bye, Mama! (2020).

Filmography

Television series

Film

References

External links 
 
 
 

1991 births
Living people
Dankook University alumni
South Korean male film actors
South Korean male television actors
21st-century South Korean male actors